Zero to Hero (阴差阳错) was a MediaCorp TV Channel 8 comedy drama series which aired from 16 May 2005 to 10 June 2005. The series is unique as it portrays the traditional Chinese beliefs of the netherworld and afterlife (e.g. 18 levels of hell, incarnation) in a light-hearted way.

Synopsis
The burning of cash in the form of joss paper and other material items such as mobile phones in the form of cardboard were depicted in the series. It is a traditional Chinese belief that the deceased would receive those items burned for them in the netherworld.

Xie Jizu is a police officer who often spends his free time gambling rather than caring for his family. He dies in a car accident and went to the netherworld, where he befriends some spirits and hear the sad tales of how they died. Zhengde, a general contractor, was brutally murdered but police were never able to crack the case. Jizu decides to make amends by helping Zhengde find his murderer.

Cast
 Edmund Chen as Xie Jizu
 Chen Liping as Zhong Lizhi, Jizu's wife
 Li Xianhuan as Xie Sixi
 Xiao Liyuan as Xie Sanyuan

Other Cast
 Patricia Mok as Xie Xiumei, Jizu's sister
 Zheng Geping as Xu Zhiniang ("Elephant"), Xiumei's husband
 Zhang Wei as Xie Shiyi, Jizu and Xiumei's father
 Li Yinzhu as Wang Guiji, Jizu and Xiumei's mother
 Florence Tan as Dolly Leow, Lin Zhengde's wife
 Andrew Seow as Lin Zhengde/Xu Zhengde
 Brandon Wong as Ah Bao (Alex)
 Yao Wenlong as Ah Bang
 Chen Jyh Cheng as Newton, one of the guards of the netherworld
 Jin Yinji as Jizu's 6th great-grandmother
 Henry Thia as "Angmoh Zai"
 Ye Shipin as Ah Gu, the durian seller
 Zen Chong as Ah Ping
 Liang Tian as Uncle Tang
 Fraser Tiong as Ah Car
 Carole Lin as Ah Car's mother

Accolades
The other dramas nominated for Best Theme Song are A New Life 有福, Fish Leong 梁静茹 — Baby Blues 谁家母鸡不生蛋 (《下一秒钟》)
Fann Wong 范文芳 — Beautiful Illusions 镜中人 (《路》)
Joi Chua 蔡淳佳 — Destiny 梦在手里 (《梦在手里》)

References

External links
Official Website (Via Wayback Machine)
Official Website (Via Wayback Machine)
Zero to Hero (English)

Singapore Chinese dramas
2005 Singaporean television series debuts
2005 Singaporean television series endings
Channel 8 (Singapore) original programming